Guido Gorges (born 8 June 1973) is a German former professional footballer who played as a centre-back. He spent three seasons in the Bundesliga with TSV 1860 Munich and Hannover 96.

References

External links 
 

Living people
1973 births
German footballers
Association football central defenders
TSV 1860 Munich players
TSV 1860 Munich II players
SpVgg Greuther Fürth players
Hannover 96 players
1. FC Schweinfurt 05 players
Eintracht Braunschweig players
SV Wehen Wiesbaden players
Bundesliga players
2. Bundesliga players